Out Our Way was an American single-panel comic strip series by Canadian-American comic strip artist J. R. Williams. Distributed by Newspaper Enterprise Association, the cartoon series was noted for its depiction of American rural life and the various activities and regular routines of families in small towns. The panel introduced a cast of continuing characters, including the cowboy Curly and ranch bookkeeper Wes. Out Our Way ran from 1922 to 1977, at its peak appearing in more than 700 newspapers.

Publication history 
Out Our Way first appeared in a half-dozen small-market newspapers on March 20, 1922.

Williams used Out Our Way as an umbrella title for several alternating series, including The Bull of the Woods, Why Mothers Get Gray, Born Thirty Years Too Soon, The Worrywarts and Heroes Are Made - Not Born.

The success of the daily panel prompted a Sunday feature, but it was not a grouping of panels, as in the Sunday Grin and Bear It. Instead, the characters of Why Mothers Get Gray were expanded into a Sunday strip, Out Our Way with the Willits (aka The Willets). Williams' assistants on the Sunday strip were Neg Cochran and George Scarbo (whose own strip The Comic Zoo sometimes ran next to The Willets as a Sunday sidebar feature).

In 1957, Williams died at age 69. Out Our Way was continued by Neg Cochran, Walt Wetterberg, Paul Gringle, and Ed Sullivan until 1977.

Characters and story
The content of Out Our Way was based on Williams' own life experiences, as noted by Michael H. Price in the Fort Worth Business Press:

Rotating themes

Williams used Out Our Way as an umbrella title for several alternating series, which carried the subtitle hand-lettered within the panel border. These included The Bull of the Woods, with gags focusing on the foreman of a machine shop, and a depiction of small town family life in Why Mothers Get Gray. Don Markstein, in describing Williams' settings and themes, lists the other subtitles:

Toppers
Starting February 27, 1927, a topper, or subsidiary strip, appeared over the Sunday page: Wash Tubbs, a gag comic strip by Roy Crane. The regular Wash Tubbs feature began as a gag-a-day strip in 1924 but quickly evolved into an action-adventure strip; the topper over Out Our Way was a return to the original concept. The topper shifted focus to become A Wash Tubbs Game from September 4, 1932 to January 29, 1933. After this, the comic strip returned for a few weeks, and then became Wash Tubbs Comical Jigsaw Puzzle from March 19 to May 7, 1933. The topper was then renamed Goofy-Ginks, and ran until September 24, 1933.

Reprints
Williams' strips and cartoons were collected in several books. The Worry Wart had his own comic book in 1956. Leonard G. Lee's Algrove Publishing reprinted Williams' work in more than a dozen volumes of its Classic Reprint Series. In addition to Out Our Way Sampler: 20s, 30s & 40s (2005), their catalog includes U.S. Cavalry Cartoons, The Bull of the Woods (six volumes) and Classic Cowboy Cartoons (four volumes).

See also
Our Boarding House

References

External links
Barnacle Press: Out Our Way
Christopher. Review: Out Our Way Sampler

American comic strips
Canadian comic strips
1922 comics debuts
1977 comics endings
Gag-a-day comics
Slice of life comics